Tropidosteptes is a genus of plant bugs in the family Miridae. There are at least 30 described species in Tropidosteptes.

Species

References

Further reading

 
 
 

 
Miridae genera
Mirini